Richard Askwith is a British journalist and author. He is best-known for the cult 2004 fell running book Feet in the Clouds, which won him the Best New Writer prize at the Sports Book Awards. The book was also shortlisted for the William Hill Sports Book of the Year and the Boardman Tasker Prize for Mountain Literature.

Askwith's book Unbreakable about Lata Brandisová was voted Biography of the Year at the Sports Book Awards in 2020.

Bibliography 

 
 
  (co-written with Stephanie Shirley)
 
 
 
 
  (co-written with Tom Karen)

References

External links

Richard Askwith website

English sportswriters
Living people
1960 births